Alain Pompidou (born 5 April 1942) is a French scientist and politician. A former professor of histology, embryology and cytogenetics, he was the fourth president of the European Patent Office (EPO) from 1 July 2004 to 30 June 2007. He is the adopted son of Georges Pompidou, former President of France.

Biography 
Pompidou was born in Paris.

Professor of histology, embryology and cytogenetics (1974-2004) 
He took doctorates in medicine, biology and science. From 1974 to 2004, he was professor of histology, embryology and cytogenetics in the medical faculty of the University of Paris. Until 2004 he was also director of the laboratory of the Cochin – St Vincent de Paul – La Roche Guyon Hospital in Paris, head of the cytogenetics and pathology department, and chairman of the hospital group's advisory board. He hold tenures at the University of Alabama at Birmingham and at the Memorial Sloan-Kettering Cancer Center in New York. 

He is also the author of numerous articles and monographs on science, ethics and society, as well as on biomedical ethics.

Advisor for science policy and science ethics 
Pompidou served on the consultative and scientific committee of numerous national, European and international organisations, including the World Health Organization (WHO), UNESCO and the European Commission. 

From 1990 to 2004, he was a member and founder of the French Academy of Technologies.

Between 1986 and 1997 he acted as a special adviser to the French prime minister, the minister of research and higher education and the minister of health. 

He is also the author of Souviens-toi de l'homme: l'éthique, la vie, la mort (Payot, Paris, 1990).

He was rapporteur of the subcommission on ethics of outer space activities of the World Commission on Ethics (COMEST) of the UNESCO, and he became a member, then vice-chair of COMEST in 2004. From 1999 to 2004, he served as a spokesman on research and space policy on the French Economic and Social Council. In 1999, he authored the joint report of UNESCO and the European Space Agency (ESA) about The Ethics of Space Policy.

Member of the European Parliament (1989-1999) 
As a member of the European Parliament from 1989 to 1999, he was particularly concerned with the EU Framework Programmes for Research and Technological Development, with the preparation of the Directive on the legal protection of biotechnological inventions ("gene patent directive"), and with bioethical issues as well as in innovation policy.

From 1994 to 1999 he was president of the European Parliament's Scientific and Technological Options Assessment, as well as President of the "Intergroupe Ciel et Espace Européen".

President of the European Patent Office (2004-2007) 
In 2004, he was elected by the Administrative Council of the EPO as a result of a compromise. Although former presidents of the EPO held their post for at least seven years, Alain Pompidou was president for three years. He was succeeded by Alison Brimelow for an equal term. Alain Pompidou was the first Frenchman to hold the post of President of the EPO.

On 30 June 2004, the day before becoming president of the EPO, he and Albert-Claude Benhamou were granted , filed on 16 March 2001, for a "Device for in situ analysis and/or treatment consisting of a flexible rod and a micro-system fixed at one end of said flexible rod".

As the first president of the EPO with a background that is not specific to intellectual property, his action aimed at making the Organisation more open and at raising awareness about the importance of patent policy, in particular among policy makers.

The Saint Vincent de Paul Mortuary 
Between 1990 and 2004 he was professor in charge of a number of medical services at Saint-Vincent-de-Paul hospital, in Paris, where in 2005 a collection of 351 foetuses and still-born babies was discovered.

The Parquet de Paris (Paris Public Prosecutor's office) found that no violation of French criminal law had taken place. The relevant ministries decided to put the case to the so-called Disciplinary Commission (the competent jurisdiction regarding lecturers and hospital employees of university hospitals) which has reprimanded Pompidou. Incurring a reprimand is extremely rare.

Honours
 Knight of the National Order of the Legion of Honour Chevalier de la Légion d'Honneur
 Officer of the Order of National Merit of France (Officer de l'Ordre national du Mérite)

See also 
 Roland Grossenbacher, former chairman of the Administrative Council of the European Patent Organisation
 Dominique Guellec, former chief economist at the European Patent Office
 Peter Messerli, Vice-President of the European Patent Office, head of the DG Appeals
 Bruno van Pottelsberghe, chief economist at the European Patent Office.

References

External links
 
 Biography on the Commission on the Ethics of Scientific Knowledge and Technology of UNESCO (COMEST)
 Personal web page
 Alain Pompidou on the European Parliament web site

1942 births
Living people
Politicians from Paris
Members of the European Academy of Sciences and Arts
MEPs for France 1989–1994
MEPs for France 1994–1999
Chevaliers of the Légion d'honneur
Officers of the Ordre national du Mérite
Pierre and Marie Curie University alumni
University of Alabama at Birmingham faculty
European Patent Organisation people
Children of national leaders of France
French adoptees